Good Morning, Verônica is a Brazilian streaming television series based on the novel of the same name that premiered on October 1, 2020, on Netflix. Created by Raphael Montes, the author responsible for the novel alongside Ilana Casoy under the pseudonym Andrea Killmore, the series is directed by José Henrique Fonseca.

Starring Tainá Müller, Eduardo Moscovis and Camila Morgado, the series follows the story of Veronica Torres, a married police clerk with two children. Her routine is interrupted when she witnesses a young woman's shocking suicide the same week she receives an anonymous call from a female desperately requesting for help.

On November 10, 2020, Netflix renewed the series for its second season, that premiered on August 3, 2022.

Cast and characters

Main
Tainá Müller as Verônica "Vero" Torres / Janete Cruz / Marta
Camila Morgado as Janete Cruz (season 1)
Eduardo Moscovis as Claúdio Antunes Brandão (season 1)
Antônio Grassi as Wilson Carvana (season 1)
Elisa Volpatto as Anita Berlinger
Silvio Guindane as Nelson
Adriano Garib as Victor Prata
Johnnas Oliva as Lima
Reynaldo Gianecchini as Matias Cordeiro (season 2)
Klara Castanho as Ângela Cordeiro (season 2)
Camila Márdila as Gisele Cordeiro (season 2)
Ester Dias as Glória (season 2)
Liza Del Dala as Carol (season 2)

Recurring
José Rubens Chachá as Carlos Alberto
César Mello as Paulo Torres
Alice Valverde as Lila Torres
DJ Amorim as Rafael "Rafa" Torres
Marina Provenzzano as Janice "Nice" Cruz 
Cássio Pandolfi as Júlio Torres (season 1)
Aline Borges as Tânia Costa de Menezes (season 1)
Juliana Didone as Mônica (season 2)
Pedro Nercessian as Marido de Prata (season 2)

Guest
Pally Siqueira as Deusdete "Deusa" Camargo da Silva (season 1)
Sacha Bali as Gregório Duarte (season 1)
Julia Ianina as Marta Campos (season 1)
Charles Paraventi as Jorge
Rosa Piscioneri as Reginaa
Renan Duran as Lucca
Maria Luisa Sá as Edimara
Roberta Santiago as Eneida Lima
Vanja Freitas as Maria
Juliana Lohmann as Paloma
Raissa Xavier as Jéssica (season 1)
Rosa Maria Colyn as Rosa
Rose Germano as Neumira
Erick Vesch as Jeferson
Lucélia Pontes as Cícera
Araci Breckenfeld as Diana
Robson Santos as Maciel
Alexandre Colman as Young Cláudio (season 1)

Episodes

Series overview

Season 1 (2020)

Season 2 (2022)

References

External links
Bom Dia, Verônica on Netflix

Brazilian drama television series
Brazilian thriller television series
Portuguese-language Netflix original programming
Television shows based on Brazilian novels
Television shows set in São Paulo
2020 Brazilian television series debuts
Television shows filmed in São Paulo (state)
Works about organized crime in Brazil